Briggs High School is a four-year high school (grades 9–12) located on the southwest side of Columbus, Ohio.  It is a part of Columbus City Schools. The building was built in 1974.

Briggs' mascot and sports teams are known as the Bruins, and the school colors are purple and gold.

Notable alumni

 Tom Shearn, Former MLB player (Cincinnati Reds)
 Ty Howard, Ohio State University Defensive back, NFL defensive back (Arizona Cardinals, Cincinnati Bengals)

References

External links
 School Website

High schools in Columbus, Ohio
Public high schools in Ohio